William Halstead (February 9, 1837 – July 25, 1916) was a Union Navy sailor in the American Civil War and a recipient of the U.S. military's highest decoration, the Medal of Honor, for his actions at the Battle of Mobile Bay.

Born on January 9, 1837, in Schroeppel, New York, Halstead began his seafaring career as a young man. He first worked on whaling ships out of the Pacific Northwest, then sailed the Pacific as a merchant mariner.

Following the onset of the Civil War, he helped enforce the Union blockade at the mouth of the Mississippi River and was present at the capture of New Orleans in 1862. For this action, he was awarded the Medal of Honor four months later, on December 31, 1864.

Halstead's official Medal of Honor citation reads:
On board the U.S.S. Brooklyn during action against rebel forts and gunboats and with the ram Tennessee, in Mobile Bay, 5 August 1864. Despite severe damage to his ship and the loss of several men on board as enemy fire raked her decks from stem to stern, Halstead fought his gun with skill and courage throughout the furious battle which resulted in the surrender of the prize rebel ram Tennessee and in the damaging and destruction of batteries at Fort Morgan.

After the war, Halstead settled in Toledo, Ohio, and worked for the Wheeling and Lake Erie Railway. He died on July 23, 1916, at age 79 and was buried at Forest Cemetery in Toledo. He is one of two Medal of Honor recipients interred in the cemetery, the other being fellow Civil War veteran Mark Wood.

See also

Battle of Mobile Bay

Notes

References

External links 
 Find A Grave Genealogy at https://www.findagrave.com/memorial/19737487

1837 births
1916 deaths
People from Oswego County, New York
People of New York (state) in the American Civil War
Union Navy sailors
United States Navy Medal of Honor recipients
American Civil War recipients of the Medal of Honor